Mónica Fernández, better known as Toti Fernández (born in Guatemala City on March 18, 1968) is a triathlete and ultramarathon runner, lecturer, author, entrepreneur and mother. She won the 2000 and 2001 Ultraman events.

Biography

Birth and childhood 
Toti Fernández was born in Guatemala City on March 18, 1968, the youngest of 6 siblings. When she was only ten years old, both her parents died of lung cancer: first her mother, and eight months later, her father.

Early years 

Toti’s life changed drastically when she had to move to Mexico City to live with her father’s sister, who became her tutor. Having to live in 17 different houses and invaded by rebelliousness, she started smoking when she was only 16 and became a heavy smoker of two packs a day. At age 22, she took up swimming to counter for the harmful effects of tobacco and quit smoking when she found her true passion: triathlon.

Sports career 

After participating in several triathlon races, both sprint and Olympic, Toti participated in her first Ironman, becoming the first Guatemalan female to finish this race (Hawaii, 1997).

Seeking further challenges and longer distances, Toti registered for an Ultraman competition, a three-day triathlon that circles the island of Kona, the largest island in Hawaii. After becoming a two-time Ultraman world champion in 2000 y 2001, Toti decided to train for ultra marathons.

She has participated in three of the ten toughest races in the world, as classified by National Geographic: the Marathon des Sables, Badwater and Furnace Creek 508, now called Silver State 508.

Toti was the second placed woman and twelfth overall at the Death Valley Cup, a double race consisting of Badwater and Furnace Creek 508 during the same calendar year.

Present 

Toti is presently living in Guatemala City with her two sons. Founder and teacher of Baby Survival Swim, a swimming school that trains children and babies to survive in case they accidentally fall into a body of water, by now she can account for several testimonies of survival. Toti also specializes in teaching technique and style to children ages four and older, and teaches adults as well.

She is the author of the autobiographic book "210,000 kilómetros" (130,000 Miles), in which she narrates her own experience in three of top ten toughest competitions in the world according to National Geographic, sharing with the reader not only her sports career but also the most difficult moments and challenges of her personal life. The purpose of the book is to share her experiences, both the good and the bad, and to motivate her readers to pursue their dreams by turning dreams into goals. Her motto is:  “In life, when facing an obstacle, one can decide to be a victim or a warrior. I chose to be a warrior.”   She also narrates how Baby Survival Swim originated and how she went about to make it happen, in spite of obstacles and hardship.

Presently, Toti gives talks and lectures on leadership, teamwork, motivation, crisis and conflict management, planning and strategy, change, and facing our fears. She wants to influence on change, motivating others to pursue their dreams and turn them into goals. “If we all become better versions of ourselves, this will have an impact on our community, on society and on the world at large”.

Awards

Bibliography 
Fernández, Mónica Toti (2015). 210,000 kilómetros. Autobiografía. .

Fernández, Mónica Toti (2015). 130,000 Miles. Autobiografía.

References

External links 
 Video Radio Infinita, Duro al Pedal (December 3).  
 Presentation of book (Book Presentation) SPORTA (December 8).
 Video Antigua Sports, Central edition (December 9).  
 The Chalina of Iron by Carlos Rodas, El Periódico, (December 12).  
 Cycle Journalism, CGN Noticias (December 15).  
 Video Nuestro mundo por la mañana, Channel 7 (January 11).  
 Undertake, Radio Actitud (January 11).  
 Video Sin Reservas, Guatevisión (January 21).  
 Magazine Healthy Deli (magazine article).  
 Magazine Of Barcelona (magazine article).  
 Magazine Local Times Digital.  
 Local magazine Local Times Digital (magazine article).  
 Magazine Pure Magazine. (magazine article).  
 Magazine Publinews (magazine article).  
 Magazine Motorbike, Bike and Run.  
 Magazin  
 Note in Blog Three Days in the Sun (April 1).  
 Note in Blog Ultraman World Championships (November 24).  
 Digital magazine Guatemaltecos Ilustres (online magazine).  
 Digital magazine Queen Sheva Wednesday: Monica Fernández (online magazine).  
 Wikipedia Notices Ultraman (Endurance Challenge).  
 Note in Blog Acerca de Toti Fernández.  
 Video La historia deportiva de Mónica Fernández, Zona Deportiva (7 de abril 2015).  
 Digital magazine Toti Fernández, Revista Domingo.  
 Infografía Deportista extrema, Pinterest.  
 It notices Blog Hall Of Fame Guatemala, Marathon Des Sables.

Living people
1968 births
People from Guatemala City
Guatemalan female triathletes